Yago (formerly known as Yago, pasión y venganza) is a Mexican telenovela produced by Carmen Armendáriz for Televisa. It is an adaptation (drastically changed) of the 1844 French novel, The Count of Monte Cristo  by Alexandre Dumas, and is also a remake of the Turkish series, Ezel. The series featured 65 episodes.

The series stars Iván Sánchez as Yago, Gabriela de la Garza as Sara, Flavio Medina as Lucio and Pablo Valentín as Abel.

Plot 
Omar, a young man from Mexico City, is betrayed by his fiancée, Sara, and two close friends, in a failed robbery plot where he was framed as the perpetrator. After being unjustly imprisoned for 11 years and faking his death to escape during a prison riot, he undergoes plastic surgery to alter his appearance and plots revenge under his new identity, "Yago". Quite different from Dumas' plot, Yago is not empowered by discovering a treasure on an island, but by a mafioso type gang lord who has a long running feud with another mafioso type.  In a tale of violence, gore, with sadistic torture and murder;  the story explores the blessing vs curse of vengeance, as opposed to forgiveness.

Cast

Main 

 Iván Sánchez as Yago Vila / Omar Guerrero López
 Gabriela de la Garza as Sara Madrigal
 Flavio Medina as Lucio Sarquis
 Pablo Valentín as Abel Cruces Pérez

Recurring 

Manuel Ojeda as Damián Madrigal Ríos
Patricio Castillo as Fidel Yampolski
Rosa María Bianchi as Carmelina "Melina" López
Juan Carlos Colombo as Jonás Guerrero
Karina Gidi as Selma de Yampolski
Mario Zaragoza as Camilo Michell
Sophie Alexander as Katia Macouzet
Ximena Romo as Ámbar Madrigal
Enoc Leaño as Thomas 
Ricardo Leguízamo as Teófilo "Teo"
Adrián Alonso as Bruno Guerrero López
Fernanda Arozqueta as Alejandra Bautista
Cassandra Sánchez Navarro as Ximena Saide Galván
Jade Fraser as Julia Michell / Fabiana Yampolski
Francisco Pizaña as Omar Guerrero López

Production
The series primarily films in Mexico City and in other locations in Mexico. Production officially began on January 18, 2016. The series completed filming in mid-June 2016. The telenovela was originally called, Yago, pasión y venganza, but it was later changed to Yago. A teaser trailer and promos were released in early April 2016.

Broadcast 
Due to lackluster viewership, the show was initially cancelled and slated to be moved to Univision's sister network, UniMás. However, on May 23, 2016, it was announced that the program would remain a part of Univision's evening lineup with a time slot switch to 10 p.m. E.T., beginning on May 30. The program took a one-week hiatus from its usual broadcast, with the premiere of the telenovela drama, Tres veces Ana, taking over its original time slot. Because of continued low ratings following its new time slot, the series was moved permanently to UniMás and episodes airs at midnight E.T., beginning June 27, 2016. On August 23, 2016, Yago premiered in Mexico on Las Estrellas at 10:30 pm.

Awards and nominations

References

External links 
Yago on Univision
Yago on Televisa

Mexican telenovelas
2016 telenovelas
Televisa telenovelas
2016 Mexican television series debuts
2016 Mexican television series endings
Blim TV original programming
Spanish-language telenovelas
Mexican television series based on Turkish television series
Non-Turkish television series based on Turkish television series
Television shows based on The Count of Monte Cristo